Hyponitrous acid is a chemical compound with formula  or HON=NOH.  It is an isomer of nitramide, H2N−NO2; and a formal dimer of azanone, HNO.

Hyponitrous acid forms two series of salts, the hyponitrites containing the [ON=NO]2− anion, and the "acid hyponitrites" containing the [HON=NO]− anion.

Structure and properties
There are two possible structures of hyponitrous acid, trans and cis.  trans-Hyponitrous acid  forms white crystals that are explosive when dry.   In aqueous solution, it is a weak acid (pKa1 = 7.21, pKa2 = 11.54), and decomposes to nitrous oxide and water with a half life of 16 days at 25 °C at  pH 1–3:
 →  + 

The cis acid is not known, but its sodium salt can be obtained.

Preparation
Hyponitrous acid (trans) can be prepared from silver(I) hyponitrite and anhydrous HCl in ether:
 + 2 HCl →  + 2 AgCl
Spectroscopic data indicate a trans configuration for the resulting acid.

It can also be synthesized from hydroxylamine and nitrous acid:
 +  →  +

Biological aspects
In enzymology, a hyponitrite reductase is an enzyme that catalyzes the chemical reaction
 + 2 NADH + 2  ↔ 2  + 2 NAD+

References

Hydrogen compounds
Nitrogen oxoacids